Levon is a country trio from Nashville, Tennessee, signed to Columbia Nashville / Epic Records. The trio is made up of Northbrook, Illinois, native Michael David Hall (on guitar and lead vocals); Sumter, South Carolina’s Jake Singleton (on harmonies, bass, and percussion); and Camden, Tennessee, native Ryan Holladay (on guitar, mandolin and harmonies).

Origin 

Jake Singleton met Michael David Hall at a restaurant where Hall was working as a server. 
They began performing together and then added Ryan Holladay as well. 
They eventually chose to name themselves Levon after The Band's Levon Helm and the Elton John song "Levon."

Their debut EP, Levon EP, was released on May 12, 2017, "Ms. Marianne" is the lead single.

In June, 2017, they were mentioned in the Tennessee Journal’s Top 5 Artists to watch at CMA fest. 
Video for “Ms. Marianne” premiered on People.com on July 31, 2017.
 
The song was placed on Sounds Like Nashville’s 10 songs to listen to in September 2017.

Levon debuted on the Grand Ole Opry on June 30, 2018. In January 2019 Levon parted ways with Sony Music Nashville.

During the Spring of 2018 Levon began performing with Kyle Egart on drums.

In 2021 and 2022 the band is the opening act for REO Speedwagon.

Albums
Levon EP (Columbia Nashville, May 12, 2017)

References

External links
 

Country music groups from Tennessee
Columbia Records artists
Musical groups established in 2014
2014 establishments in Tennessee